The Golden Lion is the highest prize given to a film at the Venice Film Festival. The prize was introduced in 1949 by the organizing committee and is now regarded as one of the film industry's most prestigious and distinguished prizes. In 1970, a second Golden Lion was introduced; this is an honorary award for people who have made an important contribution to cinema.

The prize was introduced in 1949 as the Golden Lion of Saint Mark (which was one of the best known symbols of the ancient Republic of Venice). In 1954, the prize was permanently named Golden Lion. Previously, the equivalent prize was the Gran Premio Internazionale di Venezia (Grand International Prize of Venice), awarded in 1947 and 1948. Before that, from 1934 until 1942, the highest awards were the Coppa Mussolini (Mussolini Cup) for Best Italian Film and Best Foreign Film.

History 

The prize was first awarded in 1949. Previously, the equivalent prize was the Gran Premio Internazionale di Venezia (Grand International Prize of Venice), awarded in 1947 and 1948. No Golden Lions were awarded between 1969 and 1979. According to the Biennale's official website, this hiatus was a result of the 1968 Lion being awarded to the radically experimental Die Artisten in der Zirkuskuppel: Ratlos; the website says that the awards "still had a statute dating back to the fascist era and could not side-step the general political climate. Sixty-eight produced a dramatic fracture with the past".
Fourteen French films have been awarded the Golden Lion, more than that of any other nation. However, there is considerable geographical diversity in the winners. Eight American filmmakers have won the Golden Lion, with awards for John Cassavetes and Robert Altman (both times the awards were shared with other winners who tied), as well as Ang Lee (Brokeback Mountain was the first winning US film not to tie), Darren Aronofsky, Sofia Coppola, Todd Phillips, Chloé Zhao, and Laura Poitras.

Although prior to 1980, only three of 21 winners were of non-European origin, since the 1980s, the Golden Lion has been presented to a number of Asian filmmakers, particularly in comparison to the Cannes Film Festival's top prize, the Palme d'Or, which has only been awarded to five Asian filmmakers since 1980. The Golden Lion, by contrast, has been awarded to ten Asians during the same time period, with two of these filmmakers winning it twice. Ang Lee won the Golden Lion twice within three years during the 2000s, once for an American film and once for a Chinese-language film. Zhang Yimou has also won twice. Other Asians to win the Golden Lion since 1980 include Jia Zhangke, Hou Hsiao-hsien, Tsai Ming-liang, Trần Anh Hùng, Takeshi Kitano, Kim Ki-duk, Jafar Panahi, Mira Nair, and Lav Diaz. Russian filmmakers have also won the Golden Lion several times, including since the end of the USSR.

Still, to date 33 of the 54 winners were European men (including Soviet/Russian winners). Since 1949, only seven women have ever won the Golden Lion for directing: Margarethe von Trotta, Agnès Varda, Mira Nair, Sofia Coppola, Chloé Zhao, Audrey Diwan, and Laura Poitras (though it must be noted that in 1938, German director Leni Riefenstahl won the Festival when its highest award was the Coppa Mussolini).

In 2019, Joker became the first movie based on original comic book characters to win the prize.

Golden Lion

The following films received the Golden Lions or the major awards of the Venice Film Festival: 

 Notes
 # Denotes ex-aequo win
 § Denotes unanimous win

Multiple winners
Four directors have won the award twice:
André Cayatte (1950 & 1960) 
Louis Malle (1980 & 1987) 
Zhang Yimou (1992 & 1999) 
Ang Lee (2005 & 2007)

Golden Lion Honorary Award

See also

 Leone d’Argento (Silver Lion)
 Palme d’Or, the highest prize awarded at the Cannes Film Festival
 Golden Bear, the highest prize awarded at the Berlin Film Festival

References

External links

 La Biennale di Venezia official website / Cinema history

Venice Film Festival
 
 
Awards for best film
Awards established in 1949
Italian film awards
International film awards
Lists of films by award